The Zotye Zhima E30 (芝麻) or Zotye E30 is an all-electric car that was manufactured by the Chinese manufacturer Zotye in the mid-2010s. A revised version of the model was later manufactured by Dorcen as the Dorcen E20.

Overview

The Zotye Zhima E30 was unveiled during the 2016 Shanghai Auto Show in China with prices ranging from 109,800 to 119,800 yuan at that time.

According to the official website, the Zotye Zhima E30 model was later renamed to Zotye Domy Zhima under the Domy product series.

According to Zotye, the Zotye Zhima E30 has a top speed of 80 kilometer per hour and the 16kWh unit battery has a maximum range of 150 kilometers.

Dorcen E20
As of 2019, the Zotye E30 platform was sold to Dorcen, and after a few redesigns, the model was rebadged as the Dorcen E20. For Europe, badged Elaris Finn, it gets a powertrain upgrade: , top speed of 115 kilometer per hour and a 31.5 kWh battery (Li ternary chemistry, so NMC) with 265 km of range (WLTP), rechargeable in 5h (AC, 5-100%) or 45 min (DC, 30-80%).
This is similar to Chinese spec from model year 2019.

References

External links

Production electric cars
2010s cars
E
Cars introduced in 2015
Cars of China